Buzan-razezd is a rural locality (a settlement) in Seitovsky Selsoviet, Krasnoyarsky District, Astrakhan Oblast, Russia. The population was 10 as of 2010.

References 

Rural localities in Krasnoyarsky District, Astrakhan Oblast